Stanislaus Vincent Bona (October 1, 1888 – December 1, 1967) was an American prelate of the Roman Catholic Church. He served as the bishop of the Diocese of Grand Island in Nebraska (1932–1944) and bishop of the Diocese of Green Bay in Wisconsin (1945–1967).

Biography

Early life
Stanislaus Bona was born on October 1, 1888, in Chicago, Illinois, to John and Catherine (née Śmigiel) Bona, who had immigrated to the United States from Poland in 1881. He had five siblings: Thomas (born 1882), John (born 1892), Adam (born 1896), Adolph (born 1898), and Casimir (born 1901).  Bona's brother Thomas P. Bona was also a Roman Catholic priest and longtime pastor of St. Mary of Perpetual Help Parish in Chicago (1921-1950).

Stanislaus Bona attended St. Stanislaus College in Chicago, obtaining a Bachelor of Arts degree in 1905. He continued his studies at the Pontifical North American College in Rome, there earning a Doctor of Divinity degree and Licentiate of Canon Law.

Priesthood 
Bona was ordained to the priesthood in Rome on November 1, 1912. He then served as a curate at St. Barbara Parish in Chicago until 1916, when he became resident chaplain at the House of Correction. He was later a professor at Archbishop Quigley Preparatory Seminary (1918–1922) and pastor of St. Casimir Parish in Chicago (1922–1931). He was named a monsignor in 1931 and was a board member of Religious Communities of Women.

Bishop of Grand Island
On December 18, 1931, Bona was appointed the second bishop of Grand Island by Pope Pius XI. He received his episcopal consecration on February 25, 1932, from Cardinal George Mundelein, with Bishops Paul Rhode and Francis Kelly serving as co-consecrators, at Holy Name Cathedral in Chicago. He guided the diocese through the Great Depression and World War II. During the war, he ministered to German and Italian prisoners of war kept in camps in the diocese.

Coadjutor Bishop and Bishop of Green Bay
On December 2, 1944, Bona was named coadjutor bishop of the Diocese of Green Bay and Titular Bishop of Mela by Pope Pius XII. He succeeded Bishop Paul Rhode as the seventh Bishop of Green Bay upon the latter's death on March 3, 1945. During his tenure in Green Bay, Bona founded sixty-seven grade schools, four high schools, Holy Family College, and Sacred Heart Seminary. He also established a diocesan newspaper and adjusted the social welfare program of Catholic Charities to meet new needs, including those of migrant workers. He attended all four sessions of the Second Vatican Council in Rome between 1962 and 1965.

Death and legacy 
Bona died at age 79 in Green Bay on December 1, 1967.  His cabin in Minong, Wisconsin, was listed on the National Register of Historic Places in 2020.

See also

 Catholic Church hierarchy
 Catholic Church in the United States
 Historical list of the Catholic bishops of the United States
 List of Catholic bishops of the United States
 Lists of patriarchs, archbishops, and bishops

References

External links

 Roman Catholic Archdiocese of Chicago
 Roman Catholic Diocese of Grand Island
 Roman Catholic Diocese of Green Bay

1888 births
1967 deaths
People from Chicago
Participants in the Second Vatican Council
Roman Catholic Archdiocese of Chicago
Religious leaders from Wisconsin
20th-century Roman Catholic bishops in the United States
Roman Catholic bishops of Grand Island
Roman Catholic bishops of Green Bay
Religious leaders from Illinois
Catholics from Illinois
American people of Polish descent